Ángel Luis Viña Berlanga (born 24 February 1987 in Madrid) is a Spanish footballer who plays as a centre back for Auckland City FC in the New Zealand Football Championship.

Career

Auckland City
After playing in his native Spain for Rayo Majadahonda, Berlanga signed for Auckland City in 2010, joining newly appointed manager and compatriot Ramon Tribulietx. He made his debut for the club on 15 October 2010 against Waikato at Fred Jones Park, in which Berlanga played the full 90 minutes as he helped his side to a 3–2 victory. He then scored his first goal for Auckland City in the OFC Champions League on 3 December 2010 against AS Tefana, when he scored in the 90th minute to help Auckland draw the match 1–1. He scored his first league goal for his club on 10 December 2010 against YoungHeart Manawatu in which he scored in the 23rd minute to help Auckland to a 3–1 victory.

Then, after helping Auckland City win the 2010–11 OFC Champions League, Berlanga made his debut in the FIFA Club World Cup in the 2011 FIFA Club World Cup against Kashiwa Reysol of the Japanese J. League on 8 December 2011 in which he played the full 90 minutes but could not stop Auckland City getting knocked-out after losing 2–0. Berlanga then scored his second league goal for Auckland City on 10 March 2012 against Otago United in which he scored in the 48th minute to make the score 3–0 to Auckland before Otago got a goal back to end the game by a score of 3–1. Berlanga then scored what would be his final goal for his club in the league on 7 April 2012 against Canterbury United in which he scored the equalizer for Auckland City in the 42nd minute to tie the match at 1–1 and that is the score that remained after the game was finished. Berlanga also finished his final full OFC Champions League season on 12 May 2012 against Tefana in which Berlanga played the full 90 minutes in both legs of the final to give Auckland City an aggregate victory of 3–1 and automatic qualification into the 2012 FIFA Club World Cup.

Sporting Goa
In January 2013 it was announced that Berlanga would sign with Sporting Clube de Goa of the I-League in India and on 28 January 2013 he made his debut for the club in which he started, played the full 90 minutes, and scored his first goal for the club in the process in the 67th minute to help Sporting Goa beat Salgaocar by a score of 2–0.

Return to Auckland City
After the 2012–13 I-League season concluded Berlanga re-signed for Auckland City FC right before the 2013 FIFA Club World Cup. He made his return debut for the club in the Club World Cup on 11 December 2013 against Raja Casablanca. He started the match as Auckland City lost the match 2–1. He then started for Auckland City in their league opener against Team Wellington as the club won 3–2.

Berlanga starred in Auckland City's historic 2014 FIFA Club World Cup campaign, in which the club finished third, netting the equaliser against Copa Libertadores champions San Lorenzo in the semifinal from a seemingly impossible angle; Auckland City eventually fell 2-1 in extra time. Berlanga was absent for Auckland City's third-place playoff win over Cruz Azul due to suspension.

Berlanga then started for Auckland City in their championship winning match against Team Wellington on 15 March 2014. Auckland City won 1–0 as they won the ASB Premiership. In the following years, Berlanga transitioned from a fullback to an important centreback for the club, being appointed captain following the retirement of club legend Ivan Vicelich.

Career statistics

Club
Statistics accurate as of 21 March 2014

References

External links 
 
 Ángel Berlanga Interview

1984 births
Living people
Footballers from the Community of Madrid
I-League players
Association football defenders
Expatriate footballers in India
Spanish footballers
Spanish expatriate sportspeople in India
CF Rayo Majadahonda players
Auckland City FC players
Sporting Clube de Goa players
New Zealand Football Championship players
Spanish expatriates in New Zealand